Anti-war films are films which may criticize armed conflicts in a general sense to illustrate that war is futile and a loss for all sides involved, while others focus on acts within a specific war, such as poison gas use or genocidal killing of civilians. There also are anti-war movies that use parody and black comedy to satirize wars and conflicts that do not necessarily take place on the battlefield. Additionally, non-fictional anti-war films aim to document the realities of war or historical events.

The following is a list of anti-war films.

Anti-war films

See also
 List of anti-war books
 List of anti-war songs
 List of anti-war plays
 List of anti-communist films
 List of films about nuclear issues
 List of peace activists

References

External links
 Anti-war films at the Iraq Media Action Project
 Anti-war films at AllMovie
 Antiwar Films Continue to Fizzle At The Box Office

Lists of films by common content